The 1979 Men's World Weightlifting Championships were held in Thessaloniki, Greece from November 3 to November 11, 1979. There were 189 men in action from 39 nations.

Medal summary

Medal table
Ranking by Big (Total result) medals 

Ranking by all medals: Big (Total result) and Small (Snatch and Clean & Jerk)

References
Results (Sport 123)
Weightlifting World Championships Seniors Statistics

External links
International Weightlifting Federation

World Weightlifting Championships
International weightlifting competitions hosted by Greece
World Weightlifting Championships
Sports competitions in Thessaloniki
1979 in weightlifting